The NS Class 1600 is a type of B′B′ electric locomotive built by Alstom between 1980 and 1983 based on the SNCF Class BB 7200, and in use by the Dutch Railways since 1981. They were styled by the French industrial designer Paul Arzens.

The Class 1600 was ordered in 1978, after several types of locomotives were tested in the 1970s. One of those was the SNCF BB 7200, on which the 1600 is based. The 58 locomotives were delivered between 1981 and 1983. As a result of their delivery, the old Class 1000 and Class 1500 units were taken out of service.

Thanks to the electronic power control, these locomotives were not only the most economical but also the most powerful locomotives that Dutch Railways had.

NS/Railion Class 1600
In 1999 the freight division of NS, NS Cargo, was sold to Deutsche Bahn became part of Railion as Railion Nederland. The locomotives that became the property of Railion kept their old number (1601–1637). No. 1637 was repainted red as an advertisement for the Dutch brewery Heineken and was repainted in NS Yellow in 2004.

Currently, Railion Nederland is looking to replace the Class 1600 locomotives with new multi-current locomotives type BR 189 from Germany. In early 2008 these started running into the Netherlands from Germany.

NS Class 1800
The locomotives that went to NS-Reizigers (1638–1658) had their numbers raised by 200, thus keeping their number but now in the 1800 series. In later years 10 more of the 1600 locomotives were sold to NS-Reizigers and subsequently renumbered to the 1800 series. The 1800 series was now 1823, 1824 and 1826 to 1858. Retaining the last 2 digits of their number. No. 1838 was involved in a heavy but non-fatal train crash at Amsterdam Central Station in 2005 and due to the extensive damage later scrapped.

Names 

All the 1600s and 1800s carry names & crests of Dutch towns and cities.

 a = These engines have been sold to Husa Transportation - Railway Services Nederland BV.
 l = These engines have been sold to Locon Benelux.
 h = This engine is on hire to the Bentheimer Eisenbahn AG.
 sp = Engine sold for spare parts to Shunter (maintenance company).
 t = These engines have been taken out of service and are not expected to return in service in the near future.
 † = These engines have been scrapped, due to an accident or because they were taken out of service.
 m = This engine is now part of the Railway Collection from the Railway Museum in Utrecht.

See also
Class 1700, similar to the 1600/1800 class. Some of the Class 1700 have automatic couplers (so they can quickly couple the NS DD-AR double-decker trains they are used for), which is missing on the 1600/1800 (which have never been used for these trains). The Class 1700 is a modernised version, is heavier than the 1600/1800, and has different (i.e. more modern) systems for braking and "Automatische Trein Beinvloeding ATB" (Automatic Train Control).

References

External links 

 Class 1600 Railfaneurope.net
 NS Reizigers Somda 

B′B′ locomotives
Alstom locomotives
1600
1500 V DC locomotives
Electric locomotives of the Netherlands
Standard gauge locomotives of the Netherlands
Railway locomotives introduced in 1981